Morris Medlock "Buddy" Hancken (August 30, 1914 – February 15, 2007) was an American catcher in Major League Baseball who played during the 1940 season. Hancken batted and threw right-handed. He was born in Birmingham, Alabama.

Hancken spent seven decades in professional baseball as a player, manager, coach, scout, and executive. He began his career in the minor leagues in the late 1930s with the Toledo Mud Hens and Seattle Rainiers. Then reached the Majors when manager Connie Mack knew he could catch knuckleballs and wanted him as the fourth catcher for the Philadelphia Athletics. Hancken played his only Major League game on May 14, 1940, getting a putout in the field, but he never had a chance to bat. Unfortunately, Mack sent his two knuckleballers to the minors and Hancken became expendable.

From 1942 to 1946 Hancken served in the United States Marines during World War II, but he would not leave baseball behind forever. He managed ten different minor league teams, spent time as a scout for several clubs, and served as a bench coach for the Houston Astros from 1968 through 1972. He then joined the Astros front office staff in 1971 and 1991–92, being recognized as a mentor to players like Enos Cabell, Larry Dierker and Art Howe.

Hancken died in Orange, Texas at the age of 92. At the time of his death, he was one of the oldest living former major leaguers.

Quote
Elected into the Texas Baseball Hall of Fame in 1994, Hancken best described his career in one statement. "I got to play one inning as a catcher, make one putout, meet Connie Mack and shake hands with Babe Ruth and Ty Cobb." His friend, Bill McCurdy (The Encyclopedia of Minor League Baseball), responded him with a reference to the popular baseball movie Field of Dreams: "That's OK, Buddy, at least you got your hands on the ball. Moonlight Graham never did".

Sources
Baseball Reference
The Orange Leader - Jason Rollinson article

1914 births
2007 deaths
Alexandria Aces players
Baseball players from Birmingham, Alabama
Batavia Pirates players
Baton Rouge Red Sticks players
Beaumont Exporters players
Buffalo Bisons (minor league) players
Charleston Senators players
Columbia Reds players
Fort Worth Cats players
Greenville Majors players
Houston Astros coaches
Lake Charles Lakers players
Major League Baseball catchers
Major League Baseball bench coaches
Major League Baseball executives
Minnesota Twins scouts
Minor league baseball managers
New York Mets scouts
Philadelphia Athletics players
Pittsburgh Pirates scouts
Seattle Rainiers players
Toledo Mud Hens players
Waco Pirates players
Washington Senators (1901–60) scouts
Williamsport Grays players